Eric Kress (born 25 March 1962)  is a Danish cinematographer.

Biography
Kress was born in Zürich on 25 March 1962 to a French father and a Danish mother. He studied cinematography at the National Film School of Denmark in Copenhagen from 1987 to 1991.

Personal life
His brother Philippe Kress is also a film photographer.

Filmography

References

External links
 
 
 

Danish cinematographers
Danish people of French descent
Best Cinematographer Bodil Award winners
1962 births
Living people